Speed skating at the 2013 Winter Universiade was held at Baselga di Piné Stadio del Ghiaccio from 13 to 19 December 2013.

Men's events

Women's events

References 
 SPORT MANUAL SPEED SKATING FISU

External links
Result Book – Speed Skating

2013 in speed skating
Speed skating
International speed skating competitions hosted by Italy
2013